Qaleh Mozaffary (also Romanized as Qal‘eh Moz̧affary; also known as Ghal‘eh Mozaffar, Qal‘eh-e Moz̧affar, and Qal‘eh Moz̧affar) is a village in Howmeh Rural District, in the Central District of Lamerd County, Fars Province, Iran. At the 2006 census, its population was 89, in 18 families.

References 

Populated places in Lamerd County